Amand Broussard House is a historic house at 1400 E. Main Street in New Iberia, Louisiana. It may be the oldest surviving Cajun house.

It was built around 1790 and added to the National Register of Historic Places on June 9, 1980.

See also
List of the oldest buildings in Louisiana

References

		
National Register of Historic Places in Iberia Parish, Louisiana
Buildings and structures completed in 1800